Mini Tagba Balogou (born December 31, 1987 in Lomé) is a Togolese footballer who currently plays  for FC Mulhouse.

Career
Balogou began his career in the youth side for Olympique Marseille and was here promoted to the second team in summer 2005. After one year with Olympique Marseille B signed his first professional contract with FC Lorient, he played only for the reserve team and signed in summer 2007 with SR Colmar. Balogou played 32 games and scores eight goals for SR Colmar in the Championnat de France amateur 2, before signed after two years on 8 June 2009 for FC Mulhouse. The midfielder joined in summer 2010 from FC Mulhouse of the France Championnat de France amateur 2 to USL Dunkerque.

International career
In the age from eighteen was his first call-up for the Togo on 10 August 2006 against Ghana national football team and played his first match on 12 November 2008. His second match was against Japan.

References

1987 births
Living people
Togolese footballers
Togo international footballers
French footballers
Olympique de Marseille players
Association football midfielders
Expatriate footballers in France
FC Mulhouse players
Togolese expatriate sportspeople in France
FC Lorient players
SR Colmar players
Association football defenders
21st-century Togolese people